Henry Winters Luce (June 24, 1868– December 7, 1941) was an American missionary and educator in China. He was the father of the publisher Henry R. Luce.

Biography 
Born in Scranton, Pennsylvania, Luce graduated from Yale University in 1892. After graduation, he stayed at Union Seminary in New York for 2 years, before his seminary training at Princeton Theological Seminary in 1896.

In 1897, Luce married Elizabeth Root, was ordained, and sent to China by the Presbyterian Board of Foreign Missions. In total, he spent 31 years in the country with Elizabeth, and where their four children were born, Henry, Emmavail, Elisabeth, and Sheldon.

Luce was a professor at Cheeloo University in Jinan, China, where he led fundraising efforts and served  as vice president for a short time. He also helped to initiate the Yale-in-China Association. In 1928, he accepted a professorship at the Kennedy School of Missions in Hartford, Connecticut. He held this position until his retirement in 1935. He died in Haverford, Pennsylvania.

Honors 
One of Luce's sons, Henry R. Luce, established a grant-making foundation as a tribute to his parents.

Luce Memorial Chapel, designed by I.M. Pei and situated on the campus of Tunghai University, Taichung, Taiwan, is named after Henry W. Luce. Construction of the chapel was sponsored by Henry R. Luce.

References

Further reading
 Brinkley, Alan. The Publisher: Henry Luce and His American Century, (Alfred A. Knopf, 2010) 531 pp. online

1868 births
1941 deaths
Yale University alumni
American Presbyterian missionaries
Presbyterian missionaries in China
American expatriates in China
People from Scranton, Pennsylvania
Academic staff of Yenching University
Academic staff of Cheeloo University
Princeton Theological Seminary alumni